Khalid Al Maskati is a Bahraini businessman and politician. He became a member of the Shura Council in 2002.

Career
Al Maskati was born in Manama on January 23, 1959. He went to Lebanon in 1974 to study at the American University of Beirut but left it shortly when the Lebanese Civil War started. Then he traveled to the Unite States and obtained his Bachelor of Business Administration with a concentration in Industrial Management from the University of Texas, graduating in 1979 with honors.

He entered the private sector, becoming the vice-chairman of the Board of Directors of Maskati Brothers & Company (MBCO). In addition, he has served on the boards of directors of the following companies:
 Hussein Mahdi Al Maskati & Sons
 Maskati Commercial Services
 Bahrain Training Institute
 Royal Humanitarian Foundation
 Trafco
 Bahrain Water Plant
 Central Bank of Bahrain
 Gulf Union Insurance & Reinsurance Company
He also served as a local managing director for United Paper Industries. He was first appointed to the Shura Council in 1996, serving until 2000 but returning in 2002.

Awards
 Isa Award

References

1959 births
Bahraini businesspeople
Bahraini politicians
Members of the Consultative Council (Bahrain)
Living people
People from Manama